Nirdoshi is a 1967 Indian Telugu-language crime drama film, produced by N. Ramabrahmam under the Sri Gowthami Pictures banner and directed by V. Dada Mirasi. It stars N. T. Rama Rao and Savitri, with music composed by Ghantasala.

Plot 
Ananda Rao and Sundaram are identical twins. Ananda Rao is a hardcore criminal, drunkard, and womaniser. He implicates Sundaram in a bank robbery and the court has sentenced him to 7 years of jail. One night Sundaram escapes, reaches his brother, and tells him that he is innocent. Ananda Rao calls Police, and Sundaram tries to escape, in the quarrel Anand Rao dies of a heart attack, and Sundaram exchanges their clothes and starts acting like Ananda Rao. Since then he has to face many problems, protecting himself from his brother's gang men and its leader Gangadharam; the second one Kamala, daughter of Ramesam, who is engaged to Ananda Rao, and the third comes as Lakshmi, the abandoned wife of Ananda Rao, who arrives with the child and with no other choice, he keeps her as a maid.

Meanwhile, Kamala learns that her father is blackmailed by an unknown person, she finds out it is Ananda Rao and threatens Sundaram; making him agree to their marriage. Even after the marriage, the anonymous letters to Ramesam did not stop, which were written by Gangadharam and he dies. In that anger, Kamala meets with an accident where she is paralysed and also loses her voice too. Here Sundaram reveals the entire truth to Kamala and Lakshmi with all proof. Meanwhile, a servant Naganna, father of Lakshmi, who wants to take revenge against Ananda Rao, poisons Kamala. Lakshmi tries to stop him in that quarrel, but Naganna kills her and implicates Sundaram in the case. At the same time, Sundaram catches all the gangsters responsible for the bank robbery. Parallelly, Kamala slowly recovers and gets back her voice. Finally, she proves her husband as Sundaram and the real culprits are Gangadharam and Naganna. The film ends with the court acquitting Sundaram.

Cast 
N. T. Rama Rao as Ananda Rao and Sundaram
Savitri as Kamala
Anjali Devi as Lakshmi
Satyanarayana as Gangadharam
Padmanabham as Sambu
Allu Ramalingaiah
Geetanjali as Manjula
Mikkilineni as Ramesam
Mukkamala as Naganna
Raavi Kondala Rao as Doctor
Malladi as Dharmanna
Ch. Krishna Murthy as Ramu
Jagga Rao as Police Inspector

Soundtrack 
Music composed by Ghantasala.

References

External links 
 

1960s Telugu-language films
1967 crime drama films
Films scored by Ghantasala (musician)
Indian crime drama films